Two in a Crowd is a 1936 romantic comedy film directed by Alfred E. Green and starring Joan Bennett and Joel McCrea. It was released by Universal Pictures. The screenplay was written by Lewis R. Foster, Doris Malloy, and Earle Snell, based on story by Lewis R. Foster.

Plot
Larry Stevens is about to be evicted by landlady Lillie for not paying his rent. He happens to be passing by, as does Julia Wayne, when two halves of a ripped $1,000 bill float down to the street.

Up above, gangster Bonelli has been handing out thousands to his girls. One who's angry with him has torn it and tossed it out the window.

Skeeter, a jockey, joins up with Julia and Larry as they discuss what to do with the money. Julia has a $500 debt she needs to repay. Larry wants to use it to enter his horse Hector's Pal in a big race.

The money was stolen from a bank where Larry takes the torn $1,000 bill. A suspicious detective, Flynn, begins to follow Larry, who also attracts the attention of unemployed actor Anthony and bank cashier Bennett, who want a piece of the action.

Larry is in love with Julia and wants to help fulfill her dream of performing in a show. A theatrical producer pretends to hire her on talent, but secretly has schemed with Larry to finance the show if his horse wins the race. Julia races to the race track to see how it all turns out.

Cast
 Joan Bennett as Julia Wayne
 Joel McCrea as Larry Stevens
 Reginald Denny as Anthony
 Elisha Cook, Jr. as Skeeter
 John Hamilton as Purdy
 Nat Pendleton as Flynn
 Donald Meek as Bennett
 Andy Clyde as Jonesy
 Bradley Page as Bonelli
 Alison Skipworth as Lillie
 Paul Fix as Bonelli's Henchman

External links 

 
Two in a Crowd at Allmovie

1936 films
Films directed by Alfred E. Green
American black-and-white films
1936 romantic comedy films
American romantic comedy films
1930s English-language films
1930s American films